Macmerry is a village located on the old A1 (now renumbered the A199) just east of Tranent.

The village has a primary school with a roll of around 100.

There is an industrial estate to the east of the town. Originally this area was part of the Macmerry Aerodrome, also known as Penston, which closed in 1953.

There was a railway branch line until 1960 which served the local coal mines.

Transport
Macmerry has two major bus networks Prentice Coaches and Lothian Buses

Prentice 108 serve the village town towards either Haddington or Fort Kinnaird

Lothian Buses service 104 which is owned by Lothian Country Buses serves the area and continue on towards Gladsmuir and then Haddington. Macmerry is in Zone C of Lothian Country Buses fare zone map, alongside Gladsmuir, Ormiston and Pencaitland.

See also
List of places in East Lothian
List of places in Scotland

References

External links

 Census data 2001
 Macmerry Branch of the North British Railway

Villages in East Lothian